Butkë is a community in the Korçë County, Albania. At the 2015 local government reform it became part of the municipality Kolonjë.

Notable people
Sali Butka, 19th and early 20th century freedom fighter
Gani Butka, 19th and early 20th century freedom fighter
Safet Butka, World War II freedom fighter
Qemal Butka, mayor of Tirana

References

Populated places in Kolonjë, Korçë
Villages in Korçë County